Matai Hakor(Bengali: মাতাই হাকর) which is widely known as Alutila Cave, also called Alutila Mysterious Cave (Bengali: আলুটিলা গুহা) is a cave located in Matiranga Upazila in hill district of Khagrachari, Bangladesh.

The cave formed inside the 1000-meter-high hill named Alutila (potato hill) or Arbari Hill. The hill area is surrounded by deep green forest.

The cave is 100 meters long.  It has a natural subway-like shape with cold water flowing at bottom. The cave is so dark that torches or locally sold flambeaux are used to see well enough to walk around the cave.

Gallery

References

Caves of Bangladesh
Khagrachhari District